Phenacovolva is a genus of sea snails, marine gastropod molluscs in the family Ovulidae.

Description
The narrow, tubular shells taper at both ends. The shell grows to a length of 6 cm.

Distribution
These species can usually be found on gorgonians in deep water in the Indo-Pacific.

Species
Species within the genus Phenacovolva include:
 Phenacovolva aurantia (Sowerby, 1889)
 Phenacovolva barbieri Lorenz & Fehse, 2009
 Phenacovolva brevirostris (Schumacher, 1817)
 Phenacovolva clenchi Cate, 1973
 Phenacovolva dancei Cate, 1973
 Phenacovolva fusula Cate & Azuma in Cate, 1973
 † Phenacovolva gracilisiana Dolin & Lozouet, 2004
 Phenacovolva insculpta (Odhner, 1919)
 Phenacovolva lahainaensis (Cate, 1969)
 Phenacovolva lenoreae Cardin & Walls, 1980
 Phenacovolva morrisoni Lorenz & Fehse, 2009
 Phenacovolva nectarea Iredale, 1930
 Phenacovolva parvita Cate & Azuma in Cate, 1973
 Phenacovolva patriciae Nolf, 2008
 Phenacovolva philippinarum (Sowerby, 1848)
 Phenacovolva poppei Fehse, 2000
 † Phenacovolva propheta Dolin & Lozouet, 2004
 Phenacovolva pseudogracilis Cate & Azuma in Cate, 1973
 Phenacovolva recurva (Sowerby in A. Adams & Reeve, 1848)
 Phenacovolva rehderi Cate, 1973
 Phenacovolva rosea (A. Adams, 1854)
 Phenacovolva schmidi Fehse & Wiese, 1993
 Phenacovolva subreflexa (Sowerby in A. Adams & Reeve, 1848)
 Phenacovolva zuidafrikaana (Cate, 1975)
Species brought into synonymy
 Phenacovolva acuminata (A. Adams & Reeve, 1848): synonym of Simnialena acuminata (Sowerby in A. Adams & Reeve, 1848)
 Phenacovolva angasi (Reeve, 1865): synonym of Pellasimnia angasi (Reeve, 1865)
 Phenacovolva bartschi Cate, 1973: synonym of Neosimnia bartschi (Cate, 1973): synonym of Simnia bartschi (Cate, 1973)
 Phenacovolva carneopicta Rehder & Wilson, 1975: synonym of Phenacovolva lahainaensis (Cate, 1969)
 Phenacovolva diantha Cate, 1973: synonym of Phenacovolva recurva (Sowerby in A. Adams & Reeve, 1848)
 Phenacovolva exsul Iredale, 1935: synonym of Pellasimnia angasi (Reeve, 1865)
 Phenacovolva gracilis (Sowerby in A. Adams & Reeve, 1848): synonym of Phenacovolva subreflexa (Sowerby in A. Adams & Reeve, 1848)
 Phenacovolva gracillima (E. A. Smith, 1901): synonym of Calcarovula gracillima (E. A. Smith, 1901)
 Phenacovolva greenbergae Cate, 1974: synonym of Quasisimnia hirasei (Pilsbry, 1913)
 Phenacovolva haynesi (Sowerby, 1889): synonym of Pellasimnia angasi (Reeve, 1865)
 Phenacovolva hirasei (Pilsbry, 1913): synonym of Quasisimnia hirasei (Pilsbry, 1913)
 Phenacovolva honkakujiana (Kuroda, 1928): synonym of Takasagovolva honkakujiana (Kuroda, 1928)
 Phenacovolva improcera (Azuma & Cate, 1971): synonym of Pellasimnia improcera (Azuma & Cate, 1971)
 Phenacovolva kashiwajimensis Cate & Azuma in Cate, 1973: synonym of Phenacovolva rehderi Cate, 1973
 Phenacovolva kiiensis Azuma & Cate, 1971: synonym of Phenacovolva recurva (Sowerby in A. Adams & Reeve, 1848)
 Phenacovolva labroguttata Schilder, 1969: synonym of Phenacovolva aurantia (Sowerby, 1889)
 Phenacovolva lindae Petuch, 1987: synonym of Cyphoma intermedium (Sowerby, 1828)
 Phenacovolva longirostrata (Sowerby, 1828): synonym of Calcarovula longirostrata (Sowerby, 1828)
 Phenacovolva piragua (Dall, 1889): synonym of Calcarovula piragua (Dall, 1889)
 Phenacovolva praenominata Iredale, 1935: synonym of Hiatavolva depressa (Sowerby, 1889)
 Phenacovolva rugosa (Cate & Azuma in Cate, 1973): synonym of Aclyvolva coarctata (G. B. Sowerby II, 1848)
 Phenacovolva tokioi Cate, 1973: synonym of Phenacovolva nectarea Iredale, 1930
 Phenacovolva vitrea Omi & Iino, 2005: synonym of Crenavolva vitrea (Omi & Iino, 2005)
 Phenacovolva wakayamensis Cate & Azuma in Cate, 1973: synonym of Kurodavolva wakayamensis (Cate & Azuma, 1973)
 Phenacovolva weaveri Cate, 1973: synonym of Phenacovolva lahainaensis (Cate, 1969)
 Phenacovolva yoshioi Azuma & Cate, 1971: synonym of Calcarovula gracillima (E. A. Smith, 1901)

References

External links
 Iredale, T. (1930). Queensland molluscan notes, No. 2. Memoirs of the Queensland Museum. 10(1): 73-88, pl. 9
 Cate, C. N. 1973. A systematic revision of the recent Cypraeid family Ovulidae. Veliger 15 (supplement): 1-117

Ovulidae
Gastropod genera